Thần Trụ Trời (Chữ Nôm: 神柱𡗶) or Ông Trụ Trời (Chữ Nôm: 翁柱𡗶), some versions call him Khổng Lồ (孔路). He was the first god, was the one who created the world by separating sky and earth by building a pillar to support sky.

Mythology
At that time, there were no creatures and no humans. Sky and earth are just a chaotic, dark area. Suddenly appeared a giant god, extremely tall, indescribably long legs. Every step he takes is ice from one area to another, from one mountain to another.

One day, the god stretched out his shoulders and stood up, raising his head to the sky. The god dug the earth, carried the stone, and built it into a large and tall pillar to support the sky. As high as the pillar is raised, the sky is like a vast curtain that is gradually raised. He alone dug, built, the stone pillars kept getting higher and higher and pushed the dome of the sky up to the blue clouds.

Since then, heaven and earth have split into two. The earth is flat like a square tray, the sky is round like an upside down bowl, where sky and earth meet is the horizon. When the sky was high and dry, the god of sky broke the pillar and threw the earth everywhere. Every stone that was thrown turned into a mountain or an island, and the earth scattered everywhere into mounds, piles, and high hills. Therefore, the ground today is no longer flat, but has concave and convex areas. the place where god dug deep to get soil and stone to build columns, today is the immense sea.

The pillar of sky is now gone. It is said that traces of that column are in Thạch Môn mountain (or An Phụ mountain ), Hải Dương region. That mountain is also known as Kình Thiên Trụ, which means Cột Chống Trời (Pillar Support Sky).

After the god Thần Trụ Trời divided heaven and earth, there were other gods who continued the work of building this world. There are many such gods, such as Thần Sao, Thần Sông, Thần Núi, Thần Biển... and other giant gods.
Therefore, there is a folk song that is still handed down to this day:

"Ông đếm cát

Ông tát bể (biển)

Ông kể sao

Ông đào sông

Ông trồng cây

Ông xây rú (núi)

Ông trụ trời..."

Another version
Some other versions call this god Khổng Lồ and some more details. This version says that:

See also
Gaia
Kingu
Pangu
Ymir, a primeval giant whose body parts were also used to create the world in the Norse creation myth
Manu
Panguite, meteoritic mineral named after Pangu, discovered in 2012
Protoplast (religion)
Purusha
Tlaltecuhtli

References

Vietnamese deities
Vietnamese mythology
Vietnamese gods